A recurring dream is a dream which is experienced repeatedly over a long period. They can be pleasant or nightmarish and unique to the person and their experiences.

Common themes in recurring dreams
Through psychological analyses and studies, some recurrent themes have been identified. These include dreaming of being chased and pursued, which has been repeatedly demonstrated as being the most frequently experienced recurrent theme. The following themes below have been found to contribute to more than half of recurring dreams:

Difficulties with house maintenance
Teeth falling out – Sigmund Freud believed that if a woman had a recurring dream of her teeth falling out that she unconsciously longed to have children, and that if a man had this dream he was afraid of castration. Neither of these claims is substantiated.
Discovering new rooms in a house – Freud believed that houses represented bodies. Others thought finding new rooms represented the dreamer finding out new things about themselves or of their own potential.
Losing control of a vehicle
Being unable to find a toilet
Having the ability to fly

The subjects of recurring dreams do vary. The following examples are also common:
 Being held down or otherwise unable to move (compare sleep paralysis)
 Nakedness in a public place
 Being held back in school or failing a test or exam you didn't know about
 Losing the ability to speak
 Escaping or being caught in a tornado/storm
 Drowning, or otherwise not being able to breathe
 Finding lost items
 Unable to turn on the lights in one's house
 Being with a significant other
 Missing a bus, taxi, plane or train, and possibly attempting to chase it
 Having to return to an old school due to an unfinished assignment or other unresolved issues
 Being chased by an animal or murderer
 One's house catching on fire
 Falling from a very high place
 Nuclear attack
 Reliving traumatic experiences

Psychological disorders associated with recurring dreams

Posttraumatic stress disorder: People suffering from posttraumatic stress disorder can often suffer from recurring dreams. These dreams are thought of as chronic nightmares that act as a symptom of PTSD. A study found that the degree of trauma had a positive relationship to distress related to dreams.
Anxiety: Evidence suggests that recurrent dreams occur during times of stress and once the problem has resolved they will cease to recur.
Obsessive compulsive disorder
Epilepsy

Possible explanations for recurring dreams

Threat simulation theory - This theory was proposed by Antti Revonsuo and states the biological function of dreaming is to simulate threatening events and then rehearse threatening  avoidance behaviors. However, this theory has come with mixed reviews. Zadra et el. found in a study on this theory that 66% of recurrent dreams contained at least one threat. For the most part, these threats involved danger and were aimed at the dreamer themselves. In contrast however, they also found that less than 15% of recurrent dreams involved realistic situations that could prove critical to one's survival. They also found that the dreamer usually did not succeed at fleeing the threat. These provide mixed support for the theory originally proposed by Revonsuo.
Gestaltist dream theory - This theory views recurrent dreams as representing the person's current state of psychic imbalance. By bringing this imbalance to consciousness through the recurrent dream, it is possible for the person to restore their self-balance.
Freud believed that recurrent traumatic dreams showed expressions of neurotic repetitive compulsions.
Jung believed that recurrent dreams played an important role in the integration of the psyche.
Culturalist dream theory, brought to light by Bonime in 1962, holds that recurrent dreams represent that it will most certainly come true, without a lack of positive change or development in a person's personality.
Lucid dream theory holds that some people dream in recurrent form and it is a normal phenomenon.

Treatment methods for recurring dreams

Practicing relaxation techniques and imagery exercises before going to sleep is a popular treatment suggestion. By imagining the dream and an intentional task to be carried out during the dream, the person will remember to carry out that task when they are actually dreaming. Then, when it occurs in the dream it will act as a prerehearsal cue in order to remind the person that they are dreaming, where they then can interact with the dream imagery. Once this is achieved, they can consult with their therapist for the best way to modify their recurrent dream to make it less traumatizing. There are several different proposals suggested to go about doing this.
Confront and conquer the feared scene, suggested by Garfield in 1974.
Alter a small aspect of the dream, suggested by Halliday in 1982.
Have the dream ego engage in conciliatory dialogue along with hostile dream figures, suggested by Tholey in 1988

See also
 Dream dictionary
 Dream interpretation
 Psychoanalytic dream interpretation
 Relaxation technique

References 

Dream